Leucadendron flexuosum, the Worcester conebush, is a flower-bearing shrub belonging to the genus Leucadendron and forms part of the fynbos. The plant is native to the Western Cape, where it occurs in the Breede River Valley near Worcester.

Description
The plant survives fires by sprouting from an underground rhizome. The seeds are stored in a toll on the female plant and fall out of the toll ground, which is spread by the wind. The plant is unisexual and there are separate plants with male and female flowers, which are pollinated by small towers.

Gallery

References 

 http://redlist.sanbi.org/species.php?species=794-48
 http://biodiversityexplorer.info/plants/proteaceae/leucadendron_flexuosum.htm
 https://www.proteaatlas.org.za/conebu.htm

IUCN Red List critically endangered species
flexuosum